Christoph Junghans is a German born American computational physicist and academic, working in multiscale modeling and computational co-design.
He is currently the group leader of the applied computer science group at Los Alamos National Laboratory.

Career 

Born in Merseburg, he was educated at Leipzig University and the Johannes Gutenberg University Mainz (PhD, 2010).
During his graduate studies he also worked at Forschungszentrum Jülich and the IBM Systems & Technology Group. Junghans joined Los Alamos National Laboratory in 2011 as a PostDoc of theoretical division and became a staff member with the applied computer science group in 2014. After being the deputy group leader for 2.5 years, he became the group leader of the applied computer science group in 2021. Until his naturalization he was one of the very few foreign national managers at Los Alamos National Laboratory.

Junghans is one of the authors of the VOTCA package and a contributor to more than a hundred open-sources projects including Gromacs, LAMMPS and Gentoo Linux.
His most-cited publications concern multi-scale modeling and understanding of polymer aggregation through  Monte Carlo as well as method development for molecular dynamics in general.

Personal life

He is married to Ann Junghans.

References

1982 births
Living people
Leipzig University alumni
Johannes Gutenberg University Mainz alumni
Max Planck Institute for Polymer Research alumni
Max Planck Society alumni
Los Alamos National Laboratory personnel
Gentoo Linux people
People from Merseburg